Levelling is the measurement of geodetic height using a levelling instrument and a level staff.

Levelling may also refer to:

Linguistics 
 Morphological leveling, the generalization of an inflection across a paradigm or between words
 Dialect levelling, the means by which dialect differences decrease

Other 
 Concrete leveling, a procedure that attempts to correct an uneven concrete surface by altering the foundation that the surface sits upon
 Cultural leveling, the process by which different cultures approach each other as a result of travel and communication
 Land levelling, the process of flattening land
 Leveling effect, a concept in acid–base chemistry
 Levelling up policy of the Boris Johnson government, a public policy of the British government
 Leveling (philosophy), an existential process which leads to a loss of individuality
 Production leveling, a technique for reducing the mura waste
 Resource leveling, a project management process
 Wear leveling, a technique for prolonging the service life of some kinds of erasable computer storage media like flash memory and solid-state drives
 Poker Leveling,  knowing what the other opponents think about the hands when playing poker
 Leveling up, the act of gaining a set number of experience points to increase your rank in a video game
  The Levelling, a 2016 British film
 Leveling and sharpening, a functions within memory
 Leveling mechanism, a practice that acts to ensure social equality
 Levelling stone, an extremely hard, flat and abrasive stone used to flatten or level the surface of a whetstone

See also
 Level (disambiguation)
 Levellers (disambiguation)